Semon Emil "Bunkie" Knudsen (October 2, 1912 – July 6, 1998) was an American automobile executive.

Early life
Semon Emil Knudsen was born on October 2, 1912 in Buffalo, New York. He was the son of former General Motors President, and Army three-star general William S. Knudsen. The nickname "Bunkie" is attributed to his relationship with his father and is derived from the World War I term for bunk mate. He was interested in mechanical things, particularly automobiles. When he asked for a car as a teenager, his father gave him one in pieces, which he had to assemble.

After attending Dartmouth College in 1931–1932, Knudsen transferred to the Massachusetts Institute of Technology and graduated in 1936 with a Bachelor of Science in general engineering.

Personal life 
Knudsen was married to Frances Anne McConnell for 58 years until her death in 1996. They had four children: Judith, Lisa, Kristina, and Peter.

Career

General Motors career 
Knudsen began working for General Motors in 1939 with Pontiac Division and rose to management quickly, becoming general manager of the Detroit Diesel Division in 1955, a vice-president of the company and general manager of Pontiac Division in July 1956.

When appointed head of Pontiac, he was given the mission to improve the marque's sales. At that time Pontiac had a reliable but stodgy image. Knudsen brought in Pete Estes from Oldsmobile as chief engineer and hired John DeLorean away from Packard to be his assistant, with the assignment to create high performance versions of Pontiac's existing models. The Pontiac Bonneville and the "wide-track Pontiacs" came from this effort. Pontiac became heavily involved in NASCAR racing under Knudsen. Pontiac's new-found performance image eventually led to a dramatic rise in new car sales with the division reaching to third place in industry standings by 1962. In 1961, Knudsen submitted a request to add a new personal-luxury car to his division's lineup to better compete with the Ford Thunderbird but was turned down as the car was assigned to Buick, which introduced it as the 1963 Riviera. Knudsen then ordered his division to fancy up the full-sized Catalina hardtop coupe with sporty and luxurious appointments, which became a reality as the Pontiac Grand Prix for 1962.

Knudsen's success at Pontiac led to his promotion to general manager of Chevrolet Division in 1961. While at Pontiac he was noted for his interest in performance, and this continued with the introduction of the Chevrolet Super Sport models. He also insisted on changes to improve the safety of the Chevrolet Corvair, which was not reported publicly until it was revealed by John DeLorean in his book On a Clear Day You Can See General Motors. Knudsen also reportedly rejected an idea to offer a Pontiac version of the revolutionary Corvair in favor a front-engine compact car to be offered by Oldsmobile (as the F-85) and Buick (as the Special) for 1961. Pontiac introduced its version of the Buick-Olds-Pontiac compact as the Tempest for 1961, but gave that car some unique engineering features such as a slanted four-cylinder engine (which was really half of a Pontiac 389 V8), rear swing axles and a rear transaxle (both derived from the Corvair) driven by a flexing shaft to eliminate the driveshaft hump for increased interior space.

Move to Ford and the larger Mustang 
Knudsen was elected as executive vice-president of GM in 1967. He was head of GM's Overseas, Industrial, and Defense Operation in February 1968 when he created controversy by resigning to become president of the Ford Motor Company. Rumors at the time suggested that Knudsen's move to Ford was prompted by his having been passed over for the GM presidency in favor of Ed Cole, the father of the small block eight cylinder engine for the Chevrolet Corvette. Henry Ford II was looking for a seasoned executive to take charge at his company, which would allow him to spend more time on outside activities; and so the opportunity for Knudsen was ripe.  Certain GM-like styling cues in several Ford products attributable to Knudsen became reality starting with the 1970 model year, including the new 'eagle beak' on the Thunderbird nicknamed the 'Bunkie Beak' by many T-Bird enthusiasts. It was similar to the V-nose grille found on the 1969 Pontiac Grand Prix, a sporty/luxurious model whose addition to the 1962 Pontiac lineup Knudsen had ordered prior to his move to Ford. Further evidence of Knudsen's styling cues can also be seen on the front-end of the completely restyled 1971 full-sized Ford line-up.

Knudsen was also credited (and criticized) for ordering the design of a larger Ford Mustang from a sporty compact ponycar to a heavier and almost-intermediate sized car for 1971, with much of the enlargement reported to be necessary in order to fit Ford's large 429 cubic-inch Cobra Jet V8 under its hood without extensive modifications (unlike the 1969–70 Boss 429 Mustang). However, by the time the '71 Mustang was introduced in September, 1970, the musclecar market had collapsed due to exorbitant insurance premiums and increasingly stringent emission regulations that led to the design of engines that could run on unleaded gasoline. Very few Mustangs were ordered with the 429 engine, which was offered only in 1971 and then dropped for 1972. The plummeting sales of the larger Mustangs led Ford to return its ponycar to its roots beginning with a downsized Mustang in 1974, based upon the Pinto platform.  Although the car was not well received by enthusiasts, it fit well into its intended market.

Firing from Ford 
Political infighting with career Ford executives, notably Lee Iacocca, led to his dismissal from Ford on September 11, 1969. Reportedly, Henry Ford II sent Ford's vice president for public relations, Ted Mecke, to Knudsen's home the previous night to inform him that he would be fired, telling Knudsen that "Henry sent me here to tell you that tomorrow will be a rough day at work." When Ford made the decision official the next day, Bunkie said "I'm shocked" to which Ford replied, "I imagine you would be." Noted for his laconic replies to difficult questions, Mr. Ford told the media "Things just didn't work out", but later reports indicated many career Ford executives allied themselves with Iacocca and were working against Knudsen. His dismissal led to a widely circulated witticism in Ford circles as the hallmark phrase of Henry Ford, "History is bunk", was turned around to "Bunkie is history".

Following Knudsen's dismissal, the presidency of Ford Motor Company would officially remain vacant for more than a year until Iacocca was promoted to that office on December 10, 1970. Iacocca himself would be dismissed in similar fashion to Knudsen some eight years later in 1978.

Later career 
After Ford, Knudsen launched a company to build motor homes called Rectrans Inc. In 1971, Knudsen became president of truck manufacturer White Motor Company in Cleveland, Ohio, where he worked until he retired in 1980 (White also became defunct that year).

He served as NASCAR National Commissioner from 1978 until his death in 1998.

Death 
Knudsen lived in Bloomfield Hills, Michigan before he died on July 6, 1998 at a nearby hospital in Royal Oak, Michigan.

Awards and honors 
 1974 – Distinguished Service Citation Award, Automotive Hall of Fame

Sources 
 "Semon Emil Knudsen." Encyclopedia of American Business History and Biography: The Automobile Industry, 1920–1980. Pages 260–264.
 "Knudsen, Semon E(mil)." Current Biography, 1974: 204–206.
 "Semon Knudsen, 85, Dies; Was Prominent Auto Executive." New York Times. (July 9, 1998. Section A, Page 25, Column 3)
 Article on Knudsen at Pontiac: http://www.pontiacserver.com/mtchiefs1.html

References 

1912 births
1998 deaths
Ford executives
General Motors former executives
People in the automobile industry
Businesspeople from Buffalo, New York
American people of Danish descent
MIT School of Engineering alumni
NASCAR commissioners
Detroit Country Day School alumni
20th-century American businesspeople